Korean Language Education Center may refer to:

Seoul National University Korean Language Education Center
Sogang University Korean Language Education Center